Mateusz Komar (born 18 July 1985) is a Polish racing cyclist, who last rode for UCI Continental team . He rode at the 2013 UCI Road World Championships.

Major results

2007
 1st Overall Tour of Małopolska
1st Stage 1
 2nd Overall Szlakiem Walk Majora Hubala
1st Young rider classification
1st Stage 1
 2nd Memoriał Henryka Łasaka
 8th Grand Prix Bradlo
 9th La Côte Picarde
2008
 5th Pomorski Klasyk
 9th Memoriał Henryka Łasaka
2009
 1st Stage 4 Bałtyk–Karkonosze Tour
 6th Memoriał Henryka Łasaka
2011
 1st Stage 5 Dookoła Mazowsza
2013
 1st Mountains classification Tour of Estonia
 1st Stage 7 Tour du Maroc
 1st Stage 4 (TTT) Dookoła Mazowsza
 2nd Puchar Ministra Obrony Narodowej
 7th Overall Baltic Chain Tour
 10th Jūrmala Grand Prix
2014
 4th Overall Dookoła Mazowsza
 4th Memoriał Andrzeja Trochanowskiego
 6th Puchar Ministra Obrony Narodowej
 8th Overall Memorial Grundmanna I Wizowskiego
2015
 6th Memoriał Henryka Łasaka
 10th Puchar Ministra Obrony Narodowej
2016
 1st Korona Kocich Gór
 Tour of Małopolska
1st Points classification
1st Stage 2
2017
 1st Overall Course de Solidarność et des Champions Olympiques
1st Stage 4
 2nd Korona Kocich Gór
 4th Puchar Ministra Obrony Narodowej
 7th Visegrad 4 Bicycle Race – GP Polski
 9th Memoriał Andrzeja Trochanowskiego
2018
 2nd Memorial Grundmanna I Wizowskiego
 9th Memoriał Andrzeja Trochanowskiego

References

External links

1985 births
Living people
Polish male cyclists
People from Słubice
Sportspeople from Lubusz Voivodeship